Vardananq (or Vardanank) is an Armenian historical novel (Armenian: Վարդանանք) by Derenik Demirchian. It is about the Armenian-Persian war (449-451 years) for the independence of Armenia.

Characters
 Vardan Mamikonian- Leader of Armenia
 Vasak of Syunik - Regional governor of Armenia
 Yazdegerd II - Persian King
 Mihrnerseh
 Ghevond Erets
 Yeghishe
 Yeznik of Kolb
 Nershapuh of Artsrunik
 Artak of Mokq
 Atom of Gnuniq
 Vahan Amatuni
 Gadisho of Khorkhoruniq
 Artak of Rshtunik
 Gedeon
 Gyut of Vahevuniq
 Garegin Srvandztya
 Arsen Ishkhan
 Hamazasp Mamikonian
 Zohrak Mamikonian - son of Vardan Mamikonian
 Shushanik Mamikonian - daughter of Vardan Mamikonian
 Great Lady - mother of Vardan Mamikonian
 Mamikonian Lady - wife of Vardan Mamikonian
 Araqel
 Sahak
 Arten uncle
 Nerseh of Urts
 Tirots Bagratuni
 Astghik - Daughter of Gedeon
 Anahit - Daughter of Gedeon, Wife of Artak of Mokq
 Ester - Wife of Gedeon
 Moses of Chorene
 Denshapuh
 Vormizd
 Dareh
 Artashir
 Varazvaghan
 Varazdught
 Parandzem - wife of Vasak of Syunik
 Atrnerseh - son of Vasak of Syunik
 Babken - son of Vasak of Syunik

References 

Armenian historical novels
1943 novels